The Western Governors' Association (WGA) is a non-partisan organization of all 22 United States governors (representing 19 U.S. states and 3 U.S. territories) that are considered to be part of the Western region of the nation.

The WGA also invites Canadian premiers (the leader of the provincial parliamentary party) of Western Canada to its annual conference.

Mission
The WGA addresses important policy and governance issues in the West, advances the role of the Western states in the federal system, and strengthens the social and economic fabric of the region.

WGA develops policy and carries out programs in the areas of natural resources, the environment, human services, economic development, international relations and state governance.

WGA acts as a center of innovation and promotes shared development of solutions to regional problems.

Strategies
The WGA takes up issues using six basic strategies:

Develop and Communicate Regional Policy
The WGA enables governors to identify issues of regional concern, to formulate regional policy for those issues, and to take action that promotes Western interests.
Serve as a Leadership Forum
The WGA provides a forum for governors and other leaders to exchange ideas, positions and experiences.
Build Regional Capacity
Through the WGA, governors and their staffs exchange information and ideas about problem solving for a wide range of practical management concerns. The exchange helps governors manage their resources more efficiently, for example, when they procure services jointly and share development costs for new programs.  The exchange also helps build rapport among governors, cabinet officers and gubernatorial staffs in the region.
Conduct Research and Disseminate Findings
The WGA develops and maintains up-to-date information on a wide range of subjects important to Western policy-makers, business leaders and educators. WGA produces occasional white papers, reports and other analyses used in the development of policy on matters important to the West.
Form Coalitions and Partnerships to Advance Regional Interests
Through the WGA, Western governors form coalitions to collectively express their positions on matters of shared interest, and together advocate a Western agenda before Congress and the executive branch of the federal government.
Build Public Understanding and Support for Regional Issues and Policy Positions
Through its annual convention, meetings, media briefings, resolutions and background papers, the WGA provides timely information for the public.

List of current Western governors
The current chair of the WGA is Republican Brad Little of Idaho and the vice chair is Democrat Jared Polis of Colorado.

The premiers of Canada's Western provinces are also typically invited to attend WGA meetings.

References

External links
 WGA Website
 West's governors plan climate strategy

State governors of the United States
Government-related professional associations in the United States
Western United States
Paradiplomacy